Monfalcone railway station serves the town and comune of Monfalcone, in the autonomous region of Friuli-Venezia Giulia, northeastern Italy.

Opened in 1860, the station is a junction between the Venice–Trieste railway and the Udine–Trieste railway.

The station is currently managed by Rete Ferroviaria Italiana (RFI). However, the commercial area of the passenger building is managed by Centostazioni. The train services are operated by Trenitalia. Each of these companies is a subsidiary of Ferrovie dello Stato (FS), Italy's state-owned rail company.

Location
Monfalcone railway station is situated at Piazza della Stazione, at the northeastern edge of the town centre.

History
On 11 June 1894, the station was connected with that of Cervignano, thus completing the Venice–Trieste railway from Venice via Portogruaro.

Features
Services inside the station include ticketing, ticket machines, a lounge, a bar and a kiosk.

Passenger and train movements
The station is a transit stop for all regional trains on the Venice–Trieste railway and the Udine–Trieste railway.

The movement of passengers at the station is about 1.7 million people per year, making Monfalcone the fourth busiest station in Friuli-Venezia Giulia in terms of numbers of passengers, after Udine, Trieste Centrale and Pordenone.

Train services
The station is served by the following service(s):

High speed services (Frecciarossa) Turin - Milan - Verona - Padua - Venice - Trieste
Intercity services Rome - Florence - Bologna - Padua - Venice - Trieste
Night train (Intercity Notte) Rome - Bologna - Venice - Udine - Trieste
Express services (Regionale Veloce) Venice - Portogruaro - Cervignano del Friuli - Trieste
Express services (Regionale Veloce) Venice - Treviso - Udine - Gorizia - Trieste
Regional services (Treno regionale) Venice - Treviso - Udine - Gorizia - Trieste
Regional services (Treno regionale) Tarvisio - Carnia - Gemona del Friuli - Udine - Cervignano del Friuli - Trieste

See also

History of rail transport in Italy
List of railway stations in Friuli-Venezia Giulia
Rail transport in Italy
Railway stations in Italy

References

This article is based upon a translation of the Italian language version as at December 2010.

Buildings and structures in the Province of Gorizia
Railway stations in Friuli-Venezia Giulia
Railway stations opened in 1860
Monfalcone